Doroshenko is a Ukrainian surname and a village name. The surname and village may refer to:

 Anatoliy Doroshenko (born 1953), Soviet-Ukrainian footballer
 Andrey Doroshenko (born 1977), Russian politician
 Andrii Doroshenko (born 1987), Ukrainian Paralympic sport shooter
 Dmytro Doroshenko (1882–1951), Ukrainian politician
 Kyrylo Doroshenko (born 1989), Ukrainian footballer
 Kostyantyn Doroshenko (born 1972), Ukrainian art critic and curator
 Maryna Doroshenko (1981–2014), Ukrainian basketballer player
 Mykhailo Doroshenko (?–1628), Cossack leader
 Oleksandr Doroshenko (born 1981), Ukrainian Paralympian athlete
 Peter Doroshenko (born 1962), Ukrainian-American art curator
 Petro Doroshenko (1627–1698), Cossack leader
 Vitali Doroshenko (born 1971), Russian footballer
 Vitalii Doroshenko (born 1994), Ukrainian-Portuguese footballer
 Yuri Doroshenko (born 1980), Ukrainian-Russian footballer

See also
 

Ukrainian-language surnames